Blaž Rola was the defending champion but lost in the first round to Marc Polmans.

Noah Rubin won the title after defeating Polmans 6–2, 3–6, 6–4 in the final.

Seeds

Draw

Finals

Top half

Bottom half

References

External links
Main draw
Qualifying draw

2018 ATP Challenger Tour
2018 Singles